In mathematics, particularly in the theory of C*-algebras, a uniformly hyperfinite, or UHF, algebra is a C*-algebra that can be written as the closure, in the norm topology, of an increasing union of finite-dimensional full matrix algebras.

Definition 

A UHF C*-algebra is the direct limit of an inductive system {An, φn} where each An is a finite-dimensional full matrix algebra and each φn : An → An+1 is a unital embedding. Suppressing the connecting maps, one can write

Classification 

If

then rkn = kn + 1 for some integer r and

where Ir is the identity in the r × r matrices. The sequence ...kn|kn + 1|kn + 2... determines a formal product

where each p is prime and tp = sup {m   |   pm divides kn  for some n}, possibly zero or infinite. The formal product δ(A) is said to be the supernatural number corresponding to A. Glimm showed that the supernatural number is a complete invariant of UHF C*-algebras.  In particular, there are uncountably many isomorphism classes of UHF C*-algebras.

If δ(A) is finite, then A is the full matrix algebra Mδ(A). A UHF algebra is said to be of infinite type if each tp in δ(A) is 0 or ∞.

In the language of K-theory, each supernatural number

specifies an additive subgroup of Q that is the rational numbers of the type n/m where m formally divides δ(A). This group is the K0 group of A.

CAR algebra 

One example of a UHF C*-algebra is the CAR algebra. It is defined as follows: let H be a separable complex Hilbert space H with orthonormal basis fn and L(H) the bounded operators on H, consider a linear map

with the property that

The CAR algebra is the C*-algebra generated by

The embedding

can be identified with the multiplicity 2 embedding

Therefore, the CAR algebra has supernatural number 2∞. This identification also yields that its K0 group is the dyadic rationals.

References 

C*-algebras